Nasreddine Ben Maati (born 14 October 1990), is a Tunisian filmmaker, actor as well as a second unit director or assistant director. He is best known for directing the films such as Weld Ammar: A Doomed Generation and Le Feu then Coexist.

Personal life
Ben Maati was born on 14 October 1990 in Tunis, Tunisia.

Career
At the age of 16, Maati became a member of the Tunisian Federation of Amateur Filmmakers (FTCA). Then he directed several short films which took part in the International Amateur Film Festival of Kélibia as well. In 2010, he directed his debut short film, Le Virage. The short was then selected for the Short Film Corner at the 2011 Cannes Film Festival. After the success of the short, he directed the next short Le Feu then Coexist in 2013.

Then in 2013, he directed his maiden documentary film Weld Ammar or Maudite Generation. The film became a hallmark which evoke Tunisian cyber-dissidents defying Internet censorship under the regime of Zine el-Abidine Ben Ali. After the critics acclaimed documentary, Maati directed his second documentary Music and the Rebels. In 2015, he acted in the French telefilm Dette d'Honneur directed by Albert Didier.

Meanwhile, he made a supporting role in the film L'Amour des hommes directed by Mehdi Ben Attia which was released in France in February 2018. In 2019, he directed the second feature film Super Lune.

Filmography

References

External links
 

Living people
Tunisian film directors
1990 births